Ocklawaha may refer to:

Ocklawaha, Florida, an unincorporated community
Ocklawaha River, a river in Florida
, a World War II tanker of the United States